IK Partners (“IK”) is a European private equity firm focused on investments in the Benelux, DACH, France, Nordics and the UK. The firm is led Christopher Masek who has been the CEO since 2015.

History
IK Partners was founded under the name Industri Kapital by Björn Savén and Kim Wahl.  The firm’s origins lie in Enskilda Ventures which in 1989 sponsored Björn Savén in raising the Scandinavian Acquisition Capital Fund (SAC) and established the London office. SAC closed with approximately €108 million in commitments, mainly from Scandinavian investors.

In the year 1993 Industri Kapital became independent through the management buyout of SAC’s assets and activities from Skandinaviska Enskilda Banken, the parent of Enskilda Ventures. SAC’s was renamed the Industri Kapital 1989 fund. In the same year, the company established offices in Stockholm and Oslo.

Funds 
Industri Kapital’s second fund, IK 1994, held its final closing with commitments totaling €250 million, broadening the investor base to include European and North American investors.

In 1997 Industri Kapital inaugurated its Hamburg office and closed its third fund, IK 1997, with commitments of €750 million. The year after, the firm completed its first investment in Germany.

The fourth fund, IK 2000, closed with €2.1 billion in commitments in the year 2000. IK 2000 made its first investment in France. Three years later, in 2003 Industri Kapital began raising its fifth fund, IK 2004.  The firm struggled in the fundraising markets, requiring over two years to hold a final closing on the fund. IK completed fundraising in 2005 with €825 million in commitments. The firm's Paris office was opened the year after.

In the year 2007 Industri Kapital closed its sixth fund, IK 2007, with commitments of €1.7 billion.

In October 2013, IK closed its seventh fund with investor commitments of approximately €1.4 billion.

In March 2016, IK closed its first small cap fund, IK Small Cap I, at its hard cap of €277 million. The fund allowed the firm to reclaim a segment in which they invested in the late 80s, early 90s.

Later the same year, IK also closed its 8th mid-cap fund, the IK VIII Fund, at its hard cap of €1.85 billion.

IK continued to grow its small cap team through the IK Small Cap II Fund, which closed in February 2018 with total commitments of €550 million (almost twice the size of its predecessor).

The firm's latest mid-cap fund, IK IX Fund, was closed in May 2020, at its hard cap of €2.85 billion, making it the largest fund in the firm's history.

IK closed its IK Small Cap III in April 2021, after raising and reaching its €1.2bn hard cap in three months (more than twice the size of its predecessor).

See also
Elfa AB, founded 1945 in Sweden, acquired in 2006

References

External links
Website
LinkedIn

Private equity firms of the United Kingdom
Private equity firms of Sweden
Financial services companies established in 1989
Financial services companies based in London